The Popeni (also: Ursoaia) is a right tributary of the river Trotuș in Romania. It discharges into the Trotuș in Boiștea.

References

Rivers of Romania
Rivers of Bacău County